This article lists important figures and events in Malaysian public affairs during the year 1982, together with births and deaths of notable Malaysians.

Incumbent political figures

Federal level
Yang di-Pertuan Agong: Sultan Ahmad Shah of Pahang
Raja Permaisuri Agong: Tengku Ampuan Afzan of Pahang
Prime Minister: Dato' Sri Dr Mahathir Mohamad
Deputy Prime Minister: Dato' Musa Hitam
Lord President: Mohamed Suffian Mohamed Hashim then Azlan Shah

State level
 Sultan of Johor: Sultan Iskandar (Deputy Yang di-Pertuan Agong)
 Sultan of Kedah: Sultan Abdul Halim Muadzam Shah
 Sultan of Kelantan: Sultan Ismail Petra
 Raja of Perlis: Tuanku Syed Putra
 Sultan of Perak: Sultan Idris Shah II
 Sultan of Pahang: Tengku Abdullah (Regent)
 Sultan of Selangor: Sultan Salahuddin Abdul Aziz Shah
 Sultan of Terengganu: Sultan Mahmud Al-Muktafi Billah Shah
 Yang di-Pertuan Besar of Negeri Sembilan: Tuanku Jaafar 
 Yang di-Pertua Negeri (Governor) of Penang: Tun Dr Awang Hassan
 Yang di-Pertua Negeri (Governor) of Malacca: Tun Syed Zahiruddin bin Syed Hassan
 Yang di-Pertua Negeri (Governor) of Sarawak: Tun Abdul Rahman Ya'kub
 Yang di-Pertua Negeri (Governor) of Sabah: Tun Mohd Adnan Robert

Events
 1 January – The time zone in Peninsular Malaysia and Singapore changed to GMT+08:00, and it has not changed since.
 1 January – The metric system of weights and measurements was introduced to replace the British imperial systems.
 3 January – Kota Darul Ehsan, the biggest arch in Malaysia was opened.
 10 January – The former Defence Minister, Tan Sri Ghazalie Shafie survived a plane crash.
 February – The construction of the Penang Bridge projects began.
 13 February – The first section of the North–South Expressway, Kuala Lumpur–Seremban Expressway toll sections from Sungai Besi to Labu was opened to traffic.
 March – The second version of Malaysian Ringgit RM 1 notes was introduced.
 April – The 1982 Malaysian General Elections. The State Assemblyman for Tampin, Negeri Sembilan, Datuk Mohd Taha Talib was found murdered. The Culture, Youth and Sports Minister Mokhtar Hashim was arrested and later convicted in connection with the murder.
 29 April – McDonald's Malaysia opened its first restaurant at Jalan Bukit Bintang, Kuala Lumpur. 
 1 July – Official opening of the East–West Highway from Gerik, Perak to Jeli, Kelantan.
 31 August – Malaysia celebrated its Silver Jubilee after 25 years of independence

Births
10 January – Quincy Tan – Malaysian Chinese singer-songwriter
12 January - Nik Nazmi Nik Ahmad - Politician and writer
18 June – Chin Eei Hui – Badminton player (doubles)
1 July – Daniel Lee Chee Hun – Malaysian Chinese singer
30 September – Hafiz Hashim – Badminton player
21 October – Lee Chong Wei – Badminton player
24 October – Mohamed Fairuz Fauzy – Malaysian A1GP driver

Deaths
16 March – Tun Syed Nasir Ismail – Speaker of the Dewan Rakyat (1978-1982)

See also
 1982 
 1981 in Malaysia | 1983 in Malaysia
 History of Malaysia

 
Years of the 20th century in Malaysia
Malaysia
1980s in Malaysia